Rashgurd (also Romanized as Rashgūrd; also known as Rashgard and Rashkord) is a village in Nakhlestan Rural District, in the Central District of Kahnuj County, Kerman Province, Iran. At the 2006 census, its population was 756, in 162 families.

References 

Populated places in Kahnuj County